Krishnan Kumar Aggarwal (born 25 January 1939) is a Kenyan field hockey player. He competed in the 1960 and 1964 Summer Olympics.

References

External links
 

1939 births
Living people
Field hockey players at the 1960 Summer Olympics
Field hockey players at the 1964 Summer Olympics
Kenyan male field hockey players
Olympic field hockey players of Kenya
Kenyan people of Indian descent